Patriot Stadium is a soccer-specific stadium located in El Paso, Texas. It was the home stadium of the PDL club, Chivas El Paso Patriots. The stadium replaced Dudley Field. Its capacity is about 3,000.

Soccer venues in Texas
Sports venues in El Paso, Texas